The 1997–98 Primera División de Fútbol Profesional season is the 46th tournament of El Salvador's Primera División since its establishment of the National League system in 1948. . The tournament began November 1997 and ended on May 31, 1998. Luis Angel Firpo won the championship game against FAS 2–0.

Notable events

Change of name and ownership
Atletico Marte changed to Atletico Arabe Marte in 1997.

New team
Atlético Arabe Marte from Soyapango were promoted, however the club relocated from Soyapango and moved to Sonsonate and Played under Sonsonate.

Notable death from 1997 season and 1998 season 
The following people associated with the Primera Division have died between the middle of 1997 and middle of 1998.

 Jorge Joaquin Canas (ex FAS player)
 Juan Francisco Barraza (ex Dragon and  Aguila player and ex  FAS, Aguila coach)

Teams

Managerial changes

Before the season

During the season

Final

Top scorers

List of foreign players in the league
This is a list of foreign players in 1997-1998. The following players:
have played at least one  game for the respective club.
have not been capped for the El Salvador national football team on any level, independently from the birthplace

C.D. Águila
  Jorge Garay
  Carlos Villarreal

Alianza F.C.
  Marcelo Bauza
  Horacio Lugo

Atletico Marte
  German Perez
  Jorge Charquero

Baygon-ADET
 

Dragon
  Delvani Quaresma
  Miguel Segura
  Julio Sopena

 (player released mid season)
  (player Injured mid season)
 Injury replacement player

El Roble
  Martin Garcia
  Ivan Nolasco

C.D. FAS
  Emiliano Pedrozo
  Juan Manuel Villarreal

C.D. Luis Ángel Firpo
  Celio Rodriguez
  Raul Toro
  Luis Oseguera

Limeno
  Gerson Voss
  Carlos L. Marin
  Carlos Rodriguez

Sonsonate
  Leonardo Rodriguez

External links
 
 
 

1998